Paul Kane is chief executive of the British technology firm CommunityDNS and from 2010 to 2017 was one of seven people entrusted with a credit card-like key to restart portions of the World Wide Web or internet which are secured with DNSSEC, after a catastrophic event such as a major security breach or terrorist attack. If such a situation arises, five keyholders will travel to the United States to meet up and restart the DNSSEC system.

Kane runs ICB, registrars for the controversial .io ccTLD.

References 

 

English businesspeople
Living people
Year of birth missing (living people)